A model is an informative representation of an object, person or system.

Model may also refer to:

Film and television
 Model (TV series), a 1997 South Korean television series
 The Model (film), a 2016 Danish thriller drama film
 Models, a 1999 Austrian drama film by Ulrich Seidl

Literature
 Model (manhwa), a 1999 series by Lee So-young
 The Model, a 2005 novel by Lars Saabye Christensen

Music
 Model (band), a Turkish rock band
 Models (band), an Australian rock band
 The Models, an English punk rock band
 "Model" (Gulddreng song), 2016
 "Das Model", a 1978 song by Kraftwerk
 "Model", a 1994 song by Avail from Dixie
 "Model", a 1991 song by Simply Red from Stars

People
 Model (surname), a surname frequently of Central European and occasionally English origins
 The Model (wrestler), ring name of Rick Martel (born 1956)
 Eddie Taubensee (born 1968), baseball player nicknamed "The Model"

Places
 Model, Colorado, an unincorporated town in the United States
 Model, Masovian Voivodeship, a village in east-central Poland

Other uses
 Model (logic), a structure that satisfies a given system of axioms
 MODEL or Movement for Democracy in Liberia, a rebel group
 Model Automobile Company, an early vehicle manufacturer in Peru, Indiana
 Models (painting) or Les Poseuses, a c.1887 work by Georges Seurat
 Soho walk-up, a type of apartment for prostitution signposted "model"
 Model (person), a role or occupation

See also
 
 
 
 
 Modell (disambiguation)
 Modelo (disambiguation)
 Model City (disambiguation)
 Model School (disambiguation)
 Model Town (disambiguation)
 Scientific modelling, minimizing a complex system to better be able to solve problems
 Model theory, the study of classes of mathematical structures
 Modeling (NLP), the process of adopting the behaviors, language, strategies and beliefs of another person or exemplar
 Modeling (psychology), learning by imitating or observing a person's behavior
 Remodeling (disambiguation)
 Space mapping
 Miniature faking, a photograph made to look like a photograph of a scale model
 Fluid mosaic model the proposal that biological cell walls consist of a double layer of non-rigid biomolecules
 Model lipid bilayer, an artificial chemical reconstruction of a biological cell wall